Joseph Justice Sr. (November 16, 1916 – July 25, 2005) was an American football, basketball, and baseball player and coach. He served as the head football coach at Rollins College in 1949. He served as the head baseball coach at Rollins from 1947 to 1971, leading the Tars to the 1954 College World Series becoming the smallest school in NCAA history to do so.

References

External links
 
 Florida Sports Hall of Fame profile

1916 births
2005 deaths
American men's basketball players
Baseball pitchers
Baseball second basemen
Orlando Senators players
Rollins Tars athletic directors
Rollins Tars baseball coaches
Rollins Tars baseball players
Rollins Tars football coaches
Rollins Tars football players
Rollins Tars men's basketball coaches
Rollins Tars men's basketball players
Sanford Seminoles players